Progress M-43 was a Russian unmanned Progress cargo spacecraft, which was launched in October 2000 to resupply the Mir space station.

Launch
Progress M-43 launched on 16 October 2000 from the Baikonur Cosmodrome in Kazakhstan. It used a Soyuz-U rocket. The launch had been delayed from the previous day.

Docking
Progress M-43 docked with Mir on 20 October 2000 at 21:16:05 UTC.

Decay
It remained in orbit until 29 January 2001, when it was deorbited. The deorbit burn occurred at 02:12 UTC.

See also

 2000 in spaceflight
 List of Progress missions
 List of uncrewed spaceflights to Mir

References

Progress (spacecraft) missions
2000 in Kazakhstan
Spacecraft launched in 2000
Spacecraft which reentered in 2001
Spacecraft launched by Soyuz-U rockets